Trudovoye is a rural locality (a settlement) and the administrative center of Trudovskoye Rural Settlement, Novousmansky District, Voronezh Oblast, Russia. The population was 512 as of 2010. There are 11 streets.

Geography 
Trudovoye is located 30 km northeast of Novaya Usman (the district's administrative centre) by road. Andreyevka is the nearest rural locality.

References 

Rural localities in Novousmansky District